Routhierville is an unorganized territory in the Bas-Saint-Laurent region of Quebec, Canada. The territory is bisected by the Matapédia River and Quebec Route 132 that runs parallel to it. There are two hamlets in the territory: the eponymous Routhierville and Milnikek.

The community of Routhierville is located on the west bank of the Matapédia River along the Canadian National Railway that was originally constructed as the Intercolonial Railway in the 1860s, while its train station was built in 1878. The community used to be called Assametquagan, meaning "appearing at the detour," but was renamed after station master Alphonse Routhier (1875-1958).

The community of Routhierville is accessible from Route 132 with a covered bridge over the Matapédia River, built in 1931 to replace a ferry. This  and  bridge was classified as a historic monument on October 1, 2009, and rebuilt in 2011.

Demographics
Population trend:
 Population in 2021: 20 (2016 to 2021 population change: 11.1%)
 Population in 2016: 18
 Population in 2011: 15 
 Population in 2006: 5
 Population in 2001: 25
 Population in 1996: 24
 Population in 1991: 40

Private dwellings occupied by usual residents: 11 (total dwellings: 15)

Notable people
 Jean Brillant - Routhierville born recipient of the Victoria Cross for actions during the Battle of Amiens during the First World War

Gallery

See also
 List of unorganized territories in Quebec

References

Unorganized territories in Bas-Saint-Laurent
La Matapédia Regional County Municipality